Porosalvania is a genus of minute sea snails, marine gastropod mollusks or micromollusks in the family Rissoidae.

Species
Species within the genus Porosalvania include:

 Porosalvania angulifera Gofas, 2007
 Porosalvania decipiens Gofas, 2007
 Porosalvania diaphana Gofas, 2007
 Porosalvania hydrobiaeformis Gofas, 2007
 Porosalvania profundior Gofas, 2007
 Porosalvania semisculpta Gofas, 2007
 Porosalvania solidula Gofas, 2007
 Porosalvania vixplicata Gofas, 2007

References

Rissoidae